Peter Durben is an American sport shooter. He competed in the Men's 50 meter Free Rifle Prone event at the 1992 Summer Olympics in Barcelona. He is also the brother of fellow Olympic rifle shooter Daniel Durben. Durben attended the University of South Florida, where he majored in chemical engineering and competed on the Bulls rifle team, which finished second in the 1989 NCAA Rifle Championship.

References 

University of South Florida alumni
University of South Florida olympians
Olympic shooters of the United States
Living people
Year of birth missing (living people)